Anthony Mariano is an American athletic director for Norwich University. In May 2021 he announced that he would be retiring following the 2021–22 academic year after 30 years in his position.

Career
Mariano's college career began at St. Lawrence University where he played for both the ice hockey and soccer teams. He graduated in 1974 with a degree in physical education. He spent the following year attending Norwich University, working as an assistant on the men's ice hockey and soccer teams while earning a master's in education. After graduating in 1975, he returned to Norwich three years later as the soccer team's head coach. He also pulled double duty as an assistant for the ice hockey team. After Don Cahoon left to take over at Princeton, Mariano became the head coach for the ice hockey team as well.

Mariano remained in charge of both programs for two seasons but decided to focus on the ice hockey team after 1984. In 1987, Mariano led Norwich to its first NCAA Tournament appearance and was named the Division III coach of the year. In 1992 he was named as the school's Athletic director and remained in that position for the next 30 years. He was instrumental in bringing in Mike McShane to head the ice hockey team in 1995, a move that bore fruit in the shape of 4 national championships and 17 consecutive conference championships.

Statistics

Regular season and playoffs

Head coaching record

Ice Hockey

References

External links

Year of birth missing (living people)
American ice hockey coaches
American men's ice hockey forwards
American soccer players
Living people
Ice hockey people from New York (state)
People from Rome, New York
St. Lawrence Saints men's ice hockey players
St. Lawrence Saints men's soccer players
Norwich Cadets men's ice hockey coaches
Norwich University faculty
Association footballers not categorized by position